Knighty Knight Bugs is a 1958 Warner Bros. Looney Tunes cartoon directed by Friz Freleng, The short was released on August 23, 1958, and stars Bugs Bunny and Yosemite Sam.

Knighty Knight Bugs is the only Bugs Bunny cartoon to win an Academy Award for Best Animated Short Film, which was awarded in 1959. The short was later included in the 1981 compilation film The Looney, Looney, Looney Bugs Bunny Movie.

Plot

King Arthur is sitting with his Knights of the Round Table, talking about hard times that have befallen the kingdom ever since the Black Knight stole the Singing Sword. He asks his knights—among them Sir Osis of Liver and Sir Loin of Beef—for a volunteer to get the sword back. The knights complain that the Black Knight has a fire-breathing dragon guarding the sword and is invincible. King Arthur angrily demands to know if the knights are all chicken, and is dismayed when he hears clucking and sees chicken feathers flying. Bugs, dressed as a court jester, dances in and tells King Arthur that "only a fool" would be crazy enough to go after the Singing Sword. The King agrees, and tells Bugs that he has to get the singing sword, or else face being put to the rack; burnt at the stake and beheaded. Bugs stops laughing and begins crying.

At the castle of the Black Knight—shown to be Yosemite Sam dressed in black armor—there is a fire-breathing dragon that belongs to Sam, but the dragon has come down with a cold from allowing its fire to get low, and thus, is prone to fits of sneezing, causing jets of flame to shoot from its nostrils. Sam feeds the dragon some coal to fuel the dragon's internal fire, and then goes back to taking a nap on his chair. Bugs sneaks in to the castle, past Sam and the dragon and to the chest where he pulls out the singing sword. He openly wonders why it is called a "singing sword" and finds out when it starts vibrating, making noises like a musical saw, to the tune of "Cuddle up a Little Closer, Lovey Mine". Sam wakes up and chases Bugs, but Bugs slams the door in Sam's face, causing his armor to fall off. Sam then wakes up the dragon, who unintentionally breathes fire on him.

Bugs runs outside the castle, chased by Sam on the dragon. Bugs ducks into a hole, and Sam slides off the dragon when trying to stop. Bugs then runs back to the castle and raises the drawbridge as Sam approaches, causing Sam to fall into the moat. When Sam demands that Bugs lowers the drawbridge, Bugs lowers it right onto Sam's head, who yells in a muffled voice to raise it back up.  Sam then uses the dragon to pull a catapult in place, gets on it and launches himself to the castle, but misses the window Bugs is looking out of, flattening his front. Next, Sam lassos a rope around one of the battlements of the castle, but as he is climbing up, Bugs whacks Sam on the head with a mallet, causing Sam to slide down the rope outside of his armor.

Thinking the coast is clear, Bugs sneaks out of the castle. Sam and his dragon are hidden behind a rock waiting for Bugs, but the dragon sneezes on Sam again, alerting Bugs to their presence. Bugs then runs back into the castle, followed by Sam and the dragon (who stops briefly to sneeze again). Bugs runs into a room, Sam and the dragon follow, then Bugs sneaks out and locks the door to what is now shown as an explosives stockade. Surrounded by all kinds of explosives, Sam tries to keep the dragon from sneezing again, warning the dragon "No, no, no! Don't sneeze, you stupid dragon, or you'll blow us to the moon!". As Bugs walks away from the castle, the dragon sneezes, and the tower, Sam and the dragon are indeed sent flying upwards towards the moon. Bugs waves goodbye, saying: "Farewell to thee". The singing sword picks up on this and starts humming "Farewell to Thee" as Bugs walks off.

Awards
Knighty Knight Bugs is the fifth Merrie Melodies/Looney Tunes entry to win the Academy Award for Best Animated Short Film in 1959. In doing so, it beat out cartoons Walt Disney Studios' Paul Bunyan and Terrytoons' Sidney's Family Tree. It was the third Oscar-nominated Bugs Bunny cartoon, after A Wild Hare in 1941 and Hiawatha's Rabbit Hunt in 1942. The Oscar was presented to John W. Burton, the producer of this cartoon. After Burton's death, the Oscar was handed to the director, Friz Freleng.

In the Tiny Toon Adventures episode "Who Bopped Bugs Bunny?", the Oscar win of Knighty Knight Bugs is a major plot point. Mirroring the real-life loss of the Terrytoons short at the Academy Awards, a character named Sappy "Slaphappy" Stanley (a parody of "Silly" Sidney, here voiced by Jonathan Winters) was defeated for the Shloscar Award. As a result, Stanley scorned the U.S. film industry and relocated to France, where despite becoming a national star still nursed a bitter grudge against Bugs, culminating in the episode's plot.

References
 The phrase "Sir Loin of Beef" was used in Bugs Bunny parody Rabbit Hood by Bugs to con the gullible Sheriff of Nottingham.
 The phrase "Sir Osis of the Liver" was used in the Bugs Bunny parody Knight-mare Hare.
 The gag on a dopey fire breathing dragon was also used in Knight-mare Hare and on the cartoon series Here Comes the Grump.

Home media
This cartoon is featured uncut on Disc 1 of the Looney Tunes Golden Collection: Volume 4 DVD set, Warner Bros. Home Entertainment Academy Awards Animation Collection, and The Essential Bugs Bunny. It is also available in the Looney Tunes Platinum Collection: Volume 3 Blu-ray and DVD.

Attractions

Bugs' White Water Rapids is a Hopkins Rides log flume themed to Knighty Knight Bugs that opened in 1998 at Six Flags Fiesta Texas in San Antonio, Texas.

See also 
 List of Bugs Bunny cartoons
 List of Yosemite Sam cartoons

References

External links

 
 

1958 films
1958 animated films
1958 short films
Arthurian animated films
Best Animated Short Academy Award winners
Short films directed by Friz Freleng
Films set in the Middle Ages
Films set in England
Films scored by Milt Franklyn
Looney Tunes shorts
Warner Bros. Cartoons animated short films
Animated films about dragons
Bugs Bunny films
Films set in castles
1950s Warner Bros. animated short films
Yosemite Sam films